The American Academy of Facial Plastic and Reconstructive Surgery is a medical society for Otolaryngologists and ENTs. It exists to promote high quality facial surgery, and runs courses, workshops, scientific presentations, and a training program.

The academy represents more than 2,700 facial surgeons throughout the world. It is a National Medical Specialty Society of the American Medical Association (AMA) and holds an official seat in both the AMA House of Delegates and the American College of Surgeons board of governors. Its members are surgeons whose focus is surgery of the face, head, and neck, and who subscribe to a code of ethics.

All members are board certified by a specialty board recognized by the American Board of Medical Specialties. A majority are certified by the American Board of Otolaryngology, which includes facial surgery. Other physician members are certified in true plastic surgery, ophthalmology, and/or dermatology. A growing number of members are board certified by the American Board of Facial Surgery.

See also
Australasian Academy of Facial Plastic Surgery

External links
 

Surgical organizations based in the United States